Eleutherodactylus fuscus is a species of frog in the family Eleutherodactylidae endemic to Jamaica. Its natural habitats are subtropical or tropical moist lowland forest and rocky areas.
It is threatened by habitat loss.

References

fuscus
Endemic fauna of Jamaica
Amphibians of Jamaica
Amphibians described in 1943
Taxonomy articles created by Polbot